Quilon Aerodrome or Kollam Airport was an aerodrome in the city of Kollam in the former state of Travancore, now in Kerala, India. During the 1920s, there were no other civil aerodromes in the kingdoms of Cochin, Travancore and the Malabar District at the time of the British ruled Madras Presidency. With the commissioning of Trivandrum International Airport in 1932 at state capital  to the south, the aerodrome fell into disuse and came to be known as the Asramam Maidan.

The landing strip of the aerodrome was strengthened with red laterite soil from the adjoining hills because the local loose soil was unsuitable for the purpose. There were no buildings in the aerodrome, however, a circular concrete pad for parking aircraft was built. The aerodrome was under the control of the Public Works Department (PWD). The aerodrome was also used for training operations. These were stopped when an accident involving a training aircraft at the boundary of the aerodrome, resulted in the death of the pilot and the trainee.

Proposal for an Aviation Academy at Old Airport
During 2009 -2012, local authorities made plans to revive the aerodrome for a flying academy with a 4,000 foot runway for light aircraft. However, since the site was now surrounded by several high-rising structures like buildings and cell phone towers and the proposal met with objections from the local population, the plans were discarded.

Revival of airstrip plans
Government of Kerala started plans to set-up 10 airstrips in Kerala including one at Asramam Old Airport area. In February 2020, the state government submitted a feasibility study report to Civil Aviation Ministry of India in this regard.

See also
 Trivandrum International Airport
 Cochin International Airport
 Calicut International Airport
 Kannur International Airport
 List of airports in India
 List of airports in Kerala state

References

History of Kollam
Transport in Kollam
Defunct airports in India
Airports in Kerala
1932 establishments in India
Airports established in 1932
20th-century architecture in India